Tachina chaetaria is a species of fly in the genus Tachina of the family Tachinidae that is endemic to Tajikistan.

References

Insects described in 1854
Diptera of Asia
Endemic fauna of Tajikistan
Insects of Central Asia
chaetaria